The Wrestling competition at the 2009 Mediterranean Games was held in the Huércal de Almería Sports Hall in Pescara, Italy from June 26 to June 29, 2005.

Medal table

Medalists

Men's freestyle

Men's Greco-Roman

Women's freestyle

References

Wrestling
2009
Mediterranean
International wrestling competitions hosted by Italy